Amaniganj may refer to:

 Amaniganj, Lucknow, a village in Lucknow, Uttar Pradesh
 Amaniganj, Faizabad, a town in Faizabad, Uttar Pradesh

 See also

 Amanganj, a town in Madhya Pradesh